BBF Television (Best Beats on Focus TV) is the first commercial Albanian music television station founded in the early 2000s at the Student City residences area in Tirana, Albania.

External links
 

{Thirowback}

Television networks in Albania
Mass media in Tirana
Mass media in Fier